The banded wattle-eye (Platysteira laticincta) is a species of bird in the family Platysteiridae. It is endemic to the Bamenda Highlands in western Cameroon. Its natural habitat is subtropical or tropical moist montane forests. It is threatened by habitat loss.

References

External links
BirdLife Species Factsheet.

banded wattle-eye
Endemic birds of Cameroon
banded wattle-eye
banded wattle-eye
Taxonomy articles created by Polbot
Fauna of the Cameroonian Highlands forests